Umid Irgashev (born 2 March 1987) is an Uzbek television and cinema actor

Umid Irgashev started his professional career as an actor in 2009. Irgashev made his first movie with "Oqpadar" in 2012 and has starred in many movies since then.

Life and career 
Umid Irgashev was born on March 2, 1987, in the city of Tashkent. His father worked as a manager in a furniture factory. His mother first worked as a nurse, and then as an economist in a bank. The actor got married in 2009. He has 3 children. He started his acting career in 2009 with his role in the movie "Oqpadar". Although this movie was Umid's first role, it received good ratings. The movie "Oqpadar" tells the story of an ugly boy whose father abandoned him. After that, he starred in several movies. In 2019, he starred in the movie "Istanbullik Milliarder", produced by Ruslan Mirzayev. The film was shot in Istanbul, Turkey, and Umid played one of the lead roles in the film. He then played the lead role in the series "Ishq o'yinlari" (Games of Love), shot by Turkish and Uzbek filmmakers from 2020 to 2021. In addition to acting, Umid Irgashev is also involved in business.

Filmography

Series

References

External links
 

1987 births
Actors from Tashkent
Living people
Uzbekistani male film actors
21st-century Uzbekistani male actors